This page lists articles related to probability theory. In particular, it lists many articles corresponding to specific probability distributions. Such articles are marked here by a code of the form (X:Y), which refers to number of random variables involved and the type of the distribution. For example (2:DC) indicates a distribution with two random variables, discrete or continuous. Other codes are just abbreviations for topics. The list of codes can be found in the table of contents.

Core probability: selected topics

Probability theory

Basic notions (bsc)

 Random variable
 Continuous probability distribution / (1:C)
 Cumulative distribution function / (1:DCR)
 Discrete probability distribution / (1:D)
 Independent and identically-distributed random variables / (FS:BDCR)
 Joint probability distribution / (F:DC)
 Marginal distribution / (2F:DC)
 Probability density function / (1:C)
 Probability distribution / (1:DCRG)
 Probability distribution function
 Probability mass function / (1:D)
 Sample space

Instructive examples (paradoxes) (iex)

 Berkson's paradox / (2:B)
 Bertrand's box paradox / (F:B)
 Borel–Kolmogorov paradox / cnd (2:CM)
 Boy or Girl paradox / (2:B)
 Exchange paradox / (2:D)
 Intransitive dice
 Monty Hall problem / (F:B)
 Necktie paradox
 Simpson's paradox
 Sleeping Beauty problem
 St. Petersburg paradox / mnt (1:D)
 Three Prisoners problem
 Two envelopes problem

Moments (mnt)

 Expected value / (12:DCR)
 Canonical correlation / (F:R)
 Carleman's condition / anl (1:R)
 Central moment / (1:R)
 Coefficient of variation / (1:R)
 Correlation / (2:R)
 Correlation function / (U:R)
 Covariance / (2F:R) (1:G)
 Covariance function / (U:R)
 Covariance matrix / (F:R)
 Cumulant / (12F:DCR)
 Factorial moment / (1:R)
 Factorial moment generating function / anl (1:R)
 Fano factor
 Geometric standard deviation / (1:R)
 Hamburger moment problem / anl (1:R)
 Hausdorff moment problem / anl (1:R)
 Isserlis Gaussian moment theorem / Gau
 Jensen's inequality / (1:DCR)
 Kurtosis / (1:CR)
 Law of the unconscious statistician / (1:DCR)
 Moment / (12FU:CRG)
 Law of total covariance / (F:R)
 Law of total cumulance / (F:R)
 Law of total expectation / (F:DR)
 Law of total variance / (F:R)
 Logmoment generating function
 Marcinkiewicz–Zygmund inequality / inq
 Method of moments / lmt (L:R)
 Moment problem / anl (1:R)
 Moment-generating function / anl (1F:R)
 Second moment method / (1FL:DR)
 Skewness / (1:R)
 St. Petersburg paradox / iex (1:D)
 Standard deviation / (1:DCR)
 Standardized moment / (1:R)
 Stieltjes moment problem / anl (1:R)
 Trigonometric moment problem / anl (1:R)
 Uncorrelated / (2:R)
 Variance / (12F:DCR)
 Variance-to-mean ratio / (1:R)

Inequalities (inq)

 Chebyshev's inequality / (1:R)
 An inequality on location and scale parameters / (1:R)
 Azuma's inequality / (F:BR)
 Bennett's inequality / (F:R)
 Bernstein inequalities / (F:R)
 Bhatia–Davis inequality
 Chernoff bound / (F:B)
 Doob's martingale inequality / (FU:R)
 Dudley's theorem / Gau
 Entropy power inequality
 Etemadi's inequality / (F:R)
 Gauss's inequality
 Hoeffding's inequality / (F:R)
 Khintchine inequality / (F:B)
 Kolmogorov's inequality / (F:R)
 Marcinkiewicz–Zygmund inequality / mnt
 Markov's inequality / (1:R)
 McDiarmid's inequality
 Multidimensional Chebyshev's inequality
 Paley–Zygmund inequality / (1:R)
 Pinsker's inequality / (2:R)
 Vysochanskiï–Petunin inequality / (1:C)

Markov chains, processes, fields, networks (Mar)

 Markov chain / (FLSU:D)
 Additive Markov chain
 Bayesian network / Bay
 Birth–death process / (U:D)
 CIR process / scl
 Chapman–Kolmogorov equation / (F:DC)
 Cheeger bound / (L:D)
 Conductance
 Contact process
 Continuous-time Markov process / (U:D)
 Detailed balance / (F:D)
 Examples of Markov chains / (FL:D)
 Feller process / (U:G)
 Fokker–Planck equation / scl anl
 Foster's theorem / (L:D)
 Gauss–Markov process / Gau
 Geometric Brownian motion / scl
 Hammersley–Clifford theorem / (F:C)
 Harris chain / (L:DC)
 Hidden Markov model / (F:D)
 Hidden Markov random field
 Hunt process / (U:R)
 Kalman filter / (F:C)
 Kolmogorov backward equation / scl
 Kolmogorov's criterion / (F:D)
 Kolmogorov’s generalized criterion / (U:D)
 Krylov–Bogolyubov theorem / anl
 Lumpability
 Markov additive process
 Markov blanket / Bay
 Markov chain mixing time / (L:D)
 Markov decision process
 Markov information source
 Markov kernel
 Markov logic network
 Markov network
 Markov process / (U:D)
 Markov property / (F:D)
 Markov random field
 Master equation / phs (U:D)
 Milstein method / scl
 Moran process
 Ornstein–Uhlenbeck process / Gau scl
 Partially observable Markov decision process
 Product-form solution / spr
 Quantum Markov chain / phs
 Semi-Markov process
 Stochastic matrix / anl
 Telegraph process / (U:B)
 Variable-order Markov model
 Wiener process / Gau scl

Gaussian random variables, vectors, functions (Gau)

 Normal distribution / spd
 Abstract Wiener space
 Brownian bridge
 Classical Wiener space
 Concentration dimension
 Dudley's theorem / inq
 Estimation of covariance matrices
 Fractional Brownian motion
 Gaussian isoperimetric inequality
 Gaussian measure / anl
 Gaussian random field
 Gauss–Markov process / Mar
 Integration of the normal density function / spd anl
 Gaussian process
 Isserlis Gaussian moment theorem / mnt
 Karhunen–Loève theorem
 Large deviations of Gaussian random functions / lrd
 Lévy's modulus of continuity theorem / (U:R)
 Matrix normal distribution / spd
 Multivariate normal distribution / spd
 Ornstein–Uhlenbeck process / Mar scl
 Paley–Wiener integral / anl
 Pregaussian class
 Schilder's theorem / lrd
 Wiener process / Mar scl

Conditioning (cnd)

 Conditioning / (2:BDCR)
 Bayes' theorem / (2:BCG)
 Borel–Kolmogorov paradox / iex (2:CM)
 Conditional expectation / (2:BDR)
 Conditional independence / (3F:BR)
 Conditional probability
 Conditional probability distribution / (2:DC)
 Conditional random field / (F:R)
 Disintegration theorem / anl (2:G)
 Inverse probability / Bay
 Luce's choice axiom
 Regular conditional probability / (2:G)
 Rule of succession / (F:B)

Specific distributions (spd)

 Binomial distribution / (1:D)
 (a,b,0) class of distributions / (1:D)
 Anscombe transform
 Bernoulli distribution / (1:B)
 Beta distribution / (1:C)
 Bose–Einstein statistics / (F:D)
 Cantor distribution / (1:C)
 Cauchy distribution / (1:C)
 Chi-squared distribution / (1:C)
 Compound Poisson distribution / (F:DR)
 Degenerate distribution / (1:D)
 Dirichlet distribution / (F:C)
 Discrete phase-type distribution / (1:D)
 Erlang distribution / (1:C)
 Exponential-logarithmic distribution / (1:C)
 Exponential distribution / (1:C)
 F-distribution / (1:C)
 Fermi–Dirac statistics / (1F:D)
 Fisher–Tippett distribution / (1:C)
 Gamma distribution / (1:C)
 Generalized normal distribution / (1:C)
 Geometric distribution / (1:D)
 Half circle distribution / (1:C)
 Hypergeometric distribution / (1:D)
 Normal distribution / Gau
 Integration of the normal density function / Gau anl
 Lévy distribution / (1:C)
 Matrix normal distribution / Gau
 Maxwell–Boltzmann statistics / (F:D)
 McCullagh's parametrization of the Cauchy distributions / (1:C)
 Multinomial distribution / (F:D)
 Multivariate normal distribution / Gau
 Negative binomial distribution / (1:D)
 Pareto distribution / (1:C)
 Phase-type distribution / (1:C)
 Poisson distribution / (1:D)
 Power law / (1:C)
 Skew normal distribution / (1:C)
 Stable distribution / (1:C)
 Student's t-distribution / (1:C)
 Tracy–Widom distribution / rmt
 Triangular distribution / (1:C)
 Weibull distribution / (1:C)
 Wigner semicircle distribution / (1:C)
 Wishart distribution / (F:C)
 Zeta distribution / (1:D)
 Zipf's law / (1:D)

Empirical measure (emm)

 Donsker's theorem / (LU:C)
 Empirical distribution function
 Empirical measure / (FL:RG) (U:D)
 Empirical process / (FL:RG) (U:D)
 Glivenko–Cantelli theorem / (FL:RG) (U:D)
 Khmaladze transformation / (FL:RG) (U:D)
 Vapnik–Chervonenkis theory

Limit theorems (lmt)

 Central limit theorem / (L:R)
 Berry–Esseen theorem / (F:R)
 Characteristic function / anl (1F:DCR)
 De Moivre–Laplace theorem / (L:BD)
 Helly–Bray theorem / anl (L:R)
 Illustration of the central limit theorem / (L:DC)
 Lindeberg's condition
 Lyapunov's central limit theorem / (L:R)
 Lévy's continuity theorem / anl (L:R)
 Lévy's convergence theorem / (S:R)
 Martingale central limit theorem / (S:R)
 Method of moments / mnt (L:R)
 Slutsky's theorem / anl
 Weak convergence of measures / anl

Large deviations (lrd)

 Large deviations theory
 Contraction principle
 Cramér's theorem
 Exponentially equivalent measures
 Freidlin–Wentzell theorem
 Laplace principle
 Large deviations of Gaussian random functions / Gau
 Rate function
 Schilder's theorem / Gau
 Tilted large deviation principle
 Varadhan's lemma

Random graphs (rgr)

 Random graph
 BA model
 Barabási–Albert model
 Erdős–Rényi model
 Percolation theory / phs (L:B)
 Percolation threshold / phs
 Random geometric graph
 Random regular graph
 Watts and Strogatz model

Random matrices (rmt)

 Random matrix
 Circular ensemble
 Gaussian matrix ensemble
 Tracy–Widom distribution / spd
 Weingarten function / anl

Stochastic calculus (scl)

 Itô calculus
 Bessel process
 CIR process / Mar
 Doléans-Dade exponential
 Dynkin's formula
 Euler–Maruyama method
 Feynman–Kac formula
 Filtering problem
 Fokker–Planck equation / Mar anl
 Geometric Brownian motion / Mar
 Girsanov theorem
 Green measure
 Heston model / fnc
 Hörmander's condition / anl
 Infinitesimal generator
 Itô's lemma
 Itô calculus
 Itô diffusion
 Itô isometry
 Itô's lemma
 Kolmogorov backward equation / Mar
 Local time
 Milstein method / Mar
 Novikov's condition
 Ornstein–Uhlenbeck process / Gau Mar
 Quadratic variation
 Random dynamical system / rds
 Reversible diffusion
 Runge–Kutta method
 Russo–Vallois integral
 Schramm–Loewner evolution
 Semimartingale
 Stochastic calculus
 Stochastic differential equation
 Stochastic processes and boundary value problems / anl
 Stratonovich integral
 Tanaka equation
 Tanaka's formula
 Wiener process / Gau Mar
 Wiener sausage

Malliavin calculus (Mal)

 Malliavin calculus
 Clark–Ocone theorem
 H-derivative
 Integral representation theorem for classical Wiener space
 Integration by parts operator
 Malliavin derivative
 Malliavin's absolute continuity lemma
 Ornstein–Uhlenbeck operator
 Skorokhod integral

Random dynamical systems (rds)
Random dynamical system / scl
 Absorbing set
 Base flow
 Pullback attractor

Analytic aspects (including measure theoretic) (anl)

 Probability space
 Carleman's condition / mnt (1:R)
 Characteristic function / lmt (1F:DCR)
 Contiguity#Probability theory
 Càdlàg
 Disintegration theorem / cnd (2:G)
 Dynkin system
 Exponential family
 Factorial moment generating function / mnt (1:R)
 Filtration
 Fokker–Planck equation / scl Mar
 Gaussian measure / Gau
 Hamburger moment problem / mnt (1:R)
 Hausdorff moment problem / mnt (1:R)
 Helly–Bray theorem / lmt (L:R)
 Hörmander's condition / scl
 Integration of the normal density function / spd Gau
 Kolmogorov extension theorem / (SU:R)
 Krylov–Bogolyubov theorem / Mar
 Law (stochastic processes) / (U:G)
 Location-scale family
 Lévy's continuity theorem / lmt (L:R)
 Minlos' theorem
 Moment problem / mnt (1:R)
 Moment-generating function / mnt (1F:R)
 Natural filtration / (U:G)
 Paley–Wiener integral / Gau
 Sazonov's theorem
 Slutsky's theorem / lmt
 Standard probability space
 Stieltjes moment problem / mnt (1:R)
 Stochastic matrix / Mar
 Stochastic processes and boundary value problems / scl
 Trigonometric moment problem / mnt (1:R)
 Weak convergence of measures / lmt
 Weingarten function / rmt

Core probability: other articles, by number and type of random variables

A single random variable (1:)

Binary (1:B)

 Bernoulli trial / (1:B)
 Complementary event / (1:B)
 Entropy / (1:BDC)
 Event / (1:B)
 Indecomposable distribution / (1:BDCR)
 Indicator function / (1F:B)

Discrete (1:D)

 Binomial probability / (1:D)
 Continuity correction / (1:DC)
 Entropy / (1:BDC)
 Equiprobable / (1:D)
 Hann function / (1:D)
 Indecomposable distribution / (1:BDCR)
 Infinite divisibility / (1:DCR)
 Le Cam's theorem / (F:B) (1:D)
 Limiting density of discrete points / (1:DC)
 Mean difference / (1:DCR)
 Memorylessness / (1:DCR)
 Probability vector / (1:D)
 Probability-generating function / (1:D)
 Tsallis entropy / (1:DC)

Continuous (1:C)

 Almost surely / (1:C) (LS:D)
 Continuity correction / (1:DC)
 Edgeworth series / (1:C)
 Entropy / (1:BDC)
 Indecomposable distribution / (1:BDCR)
 Infinite divisibility / (1:DCR)
 Limiting density of discrete points / (1:DC)
 Location parameter / (1:C)
 Mean difference / (1:DCR)
 Memorylessness / (1:DCR)
 Monotone likelihood ratio / (1:C)
 Scale parameter / (1:C)
 Stability / (1:C)
 Stein's lemma / (12:C)
 Truncated distribution / (1:C)
 Tsallis entropy / (1:DC)

Real-valued, arbitrary (1:R)

 Heavy-tailed distribution / (1:R)
 Indecomposable distribution / (1:BDCR)
 Infinite divisibility / (1:DCR)
 Locality / (1:R)
 Mean difference / (1:DCR)
 Memorylessness / (1:DCR)
 Quantile / (1:R)
 Survival function / (1:R)
 Taylor expansions for the moments of functions of random variables / (1:R)

Random point of a manifold (1:M)
 Bertrand's paradox / (1:M)

General (random element of an abstract space) (1:G)
 Pitman–Yor process / (1:G)
 Random compact set / (1:G)
 Random element / (1:G)

Two random variables (2:)

Binary (2:B)
 Coupling / (2:BRG)
 Craps principle / (2:B)

Discrete (2:D)
 Kullback–Leibler divergence / (2:DCR)
 Mutual information / (23F:DC)

Continuous (2:C)

 Copula / (2F:C)
 Cramér's theorem / (2:C)
 Kullback–Leibler divergence / (2:DCR)
 Mutual information / (23F:DC)
 Normally distributed and uncorrelated does not imply independent / (2:C)
 Posterior probability / Bay (2:C)
 Stein's lemma / (12:C)

Real-valued, arbitrary (2:R)

 Coupling / (2:BRG)
 Hellinger distance / (2:R)
 Kullback–Leibler divergence / (2:DCR)
 Lévy metric / (2:R)
 Total variation#Total variation distance in probability theory / (2:R)

General (random element of an abstract space) (2:G)
 Coupling / (2:BRG)
 Lévy–Prokhorov metric / (2:G)
 Wasserstein metric / (2:G)

Three random variables (3:)

Binary (3:B)
 Pairwise independence / (3:B) (F:R)

Discrete (3:D)
 Mutual information / (23F:DC)

Continuous (3:C)
 Mutual information / (23F:DC)

Finitely many random variables (F:)

Binary (F:B)

 Bertrand's ballot theorem / (F:B)
 Boole's inequality / (FS:B)
 Coin flipping / (F:B)
 Collectively exhaustive events / (F:B)
 Inclusion–exclusion principle / (F:B)
 Independence / (F:BR)
 Indicator function / (1F:B)
 Law of total probability / (F:B)
 Le Cam's theorem / (F:B) (1:D)
 Leftover hash lemma / (F:B)
 Lovász local lemma / (F:B)
 Mutually exclusive / (F:B)
 Random walk / (FLS:BD) (U:C)
 Schuette–Nesbitt formula / (F:B)

Discrete (F:D)

 Coupon collector's problem / gmb (F:D)
 Graphical model / (F:D)
 Kirkwood approximation / (F:D)
 Mutual information / (23F:DC)
 Random field / (F:D)
 Random walk / (FLS:BD) (U:C)
 Stopped process / (FU:DG)

Continuous (F:C)

 Anderson's theorem#Application to probability theory / (F:C)
 Autoregressive integrated moving average / (FS:C)
 Autoregressive model / (FS:C)
 Autoregressive moving average model / (FS:C)
 Copula / (2F:C)
 Maxwell's theorem / (F:C)
 Moving average model / (FS:C)
 Mutual information / (23F:DC)
 Schrödinger method / (F:C)

Real-valued, arbitrary (F:R)

 Bapat–Beg theorem / (F:R)
 Comonotonicity / (F:R)
 Doob martingale / (F:R)
 Independence / (F:BR)
 Littlewood–Offord problem / (F:R)
 Lévy flight / (F:R) (U:C)
 Martingale / (FU:R)
 Martingale difference sequence / (F:R)
 Maximum likelihood / (FL:R)
 Multivariate random variable / (F:R)
 Optional stopping theorem / (FS:R)
 Pairwise independence / (3:B) (F:R)
 Stopping time / (FU:R)
 Time series / (FS:R)
 Wald's equation / (FS:R)
 Wick product / (F:R)

General (random element of an abstract space) (F:G)
 Finite-dimensional distribution / (FU:G)
 Hitting time / (FU:G)
 Stopped process / (FU:DG)

A large number of random variables (finite but tending to infinity) (L:)

Binary (L:B)
 Random walk / (FLS:BD) (U:C)

Discrete (L:D)

 Almost surely / (1:C) (LS:D)
 Gambler's ruin / gmb (L:D)
 Loop-erased random walk / (L:D) (U:C)
 Preferential attachment / (L:D)
 Random walk / (FLS:BD) (U:C)
 Typical set / (L:D)

Real-valued, arbitrary (L:R)

 Convergence of random variables / (LS:R)
 Law of large numbers / (LS:R)
 Maximum likelihood / (FL:R)
 Stochastic convergence / (LS:R)

An infinite sequence of random variables (S:)

Binary (S:B)

 Bernoulli process / (S:B)
 Boole's inequality / (FS:B)
 Borel–Cantelli lemma / (S:B)
 De Finetti's theorem / (S:B)
 Exchangeable random variables / (S:BR)
 Random walk / (FLS:BD) (U:C)

Discrete (S:D)

 Almost surely / (1:C) (LS:D)
 Asymptotic equipartition property / (S:DC)
 Bernoulli scheme / (S:D)
 Branching process / (S:D)
 Chinese restaurant process / (S:D)
 Galton–Watson process / (S:D)
 Information source / (S:D)
 Random walk / (FLS:BD) (U:C)

Continuous (S:C)

 Asymptotic equipartition property / (S:DC)
 Autoregressive integrated moving average / (FS:C)
 Autoregressive model / (FS:C)
 Autoregressive–moving-average model / (FS:C)
 Moving-average model / (FS:C)

Real-valued, arbitrary (S:R)

 Big O in probability notation / (S:R)
 Convergence of random variables / (LS:R)
 Doob's martingale convergence theorems / (SU:R)
 Ergodic theory / (S:R)
 Exchangeable random variables / (S:BR)
 Hewitt–Savage zero–one law / (S:RG)
 Kolmogorov's zero–one law / (S:R)
 Law of large numbers / (LS:R)
 Law of the iterated logarithm / (S:R)
 Maximal ergodic theorem / (S:R)
 Op (statistics) / (S:R)
 Optional stopping theorem / (FS:R)
 Stationary process / (SU:R)
 Stochastic convergence / (LS:R)
 Stochastic process / (SU:RG)
 Time series / (FS:R)
 Uniform integrability / (S:R)
 Wald's equation / (FS:R)

General (random element of an abstract space) (S:G)

 Hewitt–Savage zero–one law / (S:RG)
 Mixing / (S:G)
 Skorokhod's representation theorem / (S:G)
 Stochastic process / (SU:RG)

Uncountably many random variables (continuous-time processes etc) (U:)

Discrete (U:D)

 Counting process / (U:D)
 Cox process / (U:D)
 Dirichlet process / (U:D)
 Lévy process / (U:DC)
 Non-homogeneous Poisson process / (U:D)
 Point process / (U:D)
 Poisson process / (U:D)
 Poisson random measure / (U:D)
 Random measure / (U:D)
 Renewal theory / (U:D)
 Stopped process / (FU:DG)

Continuous (U:C)

 Brownian motion / phs (U:C)
 Gamma process / (U:C)
 Loop-erased random walk / (L:D) (U:C)
 Lévy flight / (F:R) (U:C)
 Lévy process / (U:DC)
 Martingale representation theorem / (U:C)
 Random walk / (FLS:BD) (U:C)
 Skorokhod's embedding theorem / (U:C)

Real-valued, arbitrary (U:R)

 Compound Poisson process / (U:R)
 Continuous stochastic process / (U:RG)
 Doob's martingale convergence theorems / (SU:R)
 Doob–Meyer decomposition theorem / (U:R)
 Feller-continuous process / (U:R)
 Kolmogorov continuity theorem / (U:R)
 Local martingale / (U:R)
 Martingale / (FU:R)
 Stationary process / (SU:R)
 Stochastic process / (SU:RG)
 Stopping time / (FU:R)

General (random element of an abstract space) (U:G)

 Adapted process / (U:G)
 Continuous stochastic process / (U:RG)
 Finite-dimensional distribution / (FU:G)
 Hitting time / (FU:G)
 Killed process / (U:G)
 Progressively measurable process / (U:G)
 Sample-continuous process / (U:G)
 Stochastic process / (SU:RG)
 Stopped process / (FU:DG)

Around the core

General aspects (grl)

 Aleatoric
 Average
 Bean machine
 Cox's theorem
 Equipossible
 Exotic probability
 Extractor
 Free probability
 Frequency
 Frequency probability
 Impossible event
 Infinite monkey theorem
 Information geometry
 Law of Truly Large Numbers
 Littlewood's law
 Observational error
 Principle of indifference
 Principle of maximum entropy
 Probability
 Probability interpretations
 Propensity probability
 Random number generator
 Random sequence
 Randomization
 Randomness
 Statistical dispersion
 Statistical regularity
 Uncertainty
 Upper and lower probabilities
 Urn problem

Foundations of probability theory (fnd)

 Algebra of random variables
 Belief propagation
 Dempster–Shafer theory
 Dutch book
 Elementary event
 Normalizing constant
 Possibility theory
 Probability axioms
 Transferable belief model
 Unit measure

Gambling (gmb)

 Betting
 Bookmaker
 Coherence
 Coupon collector's problem / (F:D)
 Coupon collector's problem (generating function approach) / (F:D)
 Gambler's fallacy
 Gambler's ruin / (L:D)
 Game of chance
 Inverse gambler's fallacy
 Lottery
 Lottery machine
 Luck
 Martingale
 Odds
 Pachinko
 Parimutuel betting
 Parrondo's paradox
 Pascal's wager
 Poker probability
 Poker probability (Omaha)
 Poker probability (Texas hold 'em)
 Pot odds
 Proebsting's paradox
 Roulette
 Spread betting
 The man who broke the bank at Monte Carlo

Coincidence (cnc)

 Bible code
 Birthday paradox
 Birthday problem
 Index of coincidence
 Spurious relationship

Algorithmics (alg)

 Algorithmic Lovász local lemma
 Box–Muller transform
 Gibbs sampling
 Inverse transform sampling method
 Las Vegas algorithm
 Metropolis algorithm
 Monte Carlo method
 Panjer recursion
 Probabilistic Turing machine
 Probabilistic algorithm
 Probabilistically checkable proof
 Probable prime
 Stochastic programming

Bayesian approach (Bay)

 Bayes factor
 Bayesian model comparison
 Bayesian network / Mar
 Bayesian probability
 Bayesian programming
 Bayesianism
 Checking if a coin is fair
 Conjugate prior
 Factor graph
 Good–Turing frequency estimation
 Imprecise probability
 Inverse probability / cnd
 Marginal likelihood
 Markov blanket / Mar
 Posterior probability / (2:C)
 Prior probability
 SIPTA
 Subjective logic
 Subjectivism#Subjectivism in probability / hst

Financial mathematics (fnc)

 Allais paradox
 Black–Scholes
 Cox–Ingersoll–Ross model
 Forward measure
 Heston model / scl
 Jump process
 Jump-diffusion model
 Kelly criterion
 Market risk
 Mathematics of bookmaking
 Risk
 Risk-neutral measure
 Ruin theory
 Sethi model
 Technical analysis
 Value at risk
 Variance gamma process / spr
 Vasicek model
 Volatility

Physics (phs)

 Boltzmann factor
 Brownian motion / (U:C)
 Brownian ratchet
 Cosmic variance
 Critical phenomena
 Diffusion-limited aggregation
 Fluctuation theorem
 Gibbs state
 Information entropy
 Lattice model
 Master equation / Mar (U:D)
 Negative probability
 Nonextensive entropy
 Partition function
 Percolation theory / rgr (L:B)
 Percolation threshold / rgr
 Probability amplitude
 Quantum Markov chain / Mar
 Quantum probability
 Scaling limit
 Statistical mechanics
 Statistical physics
 Vacuum expectation value

Genetics (gnt)

 Ewens's sampling formula
 Hardy–Weinberg principle
 Population genetics
 Punnett square
 Ronald Fisher

Stochastic process (spr)

 Anomaly time series
 Arrival theorem
 Beverton–Holt model
 Burke's theorem
 Buzen's algorithm
 Disorder problem
 Erlang unit
 G-network
 Gordon–Newell theorem
 Innovation
 Interacting particle system
 Jump diffusion
 M/M/1 model
 M/M/c model
 Mark V Shaney
 Markov chain Monte Carlo
 Markov switching multifractal
 Oscillator linewidth
 Poisson hidden Markov model
 Population process
 Probabilistic cellular automata
 Product-form solution / Mar
 Quasireversibility
 Queueing theory
 Recurrence period density entropy
 Variance gamma process / fnc
 Wiener equation

Geometric probability (geo)

 Boolean model
 Buffon's needle
 Geometric probability
 Hadwiger's theorem
 Integral geometry
 Random coil
 Stochastic geometry
 Vitale's random Brunn–Minkowski inequality

Empirical findings (emp)
 Benford's law
 Pareto principle

Historical (hst)

 History of probability
 Newton–Pepys problem
 Problem of points
 Subjectivism#Subjectivism in probability / Bay
 Sunrise problem
 The Doctrine of Chances

Miscellany (msc)

 B-convex space
 Conditional event algebra
 Error function
 Goodman–Nguyen–van Fraassen algebra
 List of mathematical probabilists
 Nuisance variable
 Probabilistic encryption
 Probabilistic logic
 Probabilistic proofs of non-probabilistic theorems
 Pseudocount

Counters of articles

 "Core": 455 (570)
 "Around": 198 (200)
 "Core selected": 311 (358)
 "Core others": 144 (212)

Here k(n) means: n links to k articles. (Some articles are linked more than once.)

Statistics-related lists
Probability

Probability topics
Probability topics